Helen Metcalf Danforth (1887–1984; née Helen Pierce Metcalf) was an American university president. From 1931 to 1947, she served as the President of Rhode Island School of Design (RISD).

Early life  
Helen Metcalf Danforth was born September 3, 1887 in Providence, Rhode Island, to parents Esther (née Pierce) and Stephen Olney Metcalf. Her paternal grandmother was Helen Adelia Rowe Metcalf, the founder of Rhode Island School of Design (RISD); her paternal aunt was Eliza Greene Metcalf Radeke, a former RISD president; and her paternal uncle was Jesse H. Metcalf, a United States Senator. Her father Stephen had worked as a treasurer at RISD.  

She attended the St. Timothy's School in Maryland. In 1916 she married Dr. Murray Snell Danforth, an orthopedic surgeon, together they had three children.

Career 
In 1931, Danforth was elected as the 8th President of Rhode Island School of Design, succeeding Eliza Greene Metcalf Radeke. During her time as President, Danforth introduced the degree program (1932), and turned it into an accredited college program (1949). During her tenure the campus enlarged which included the addition of the Metcalf Building on College Street (1936), the Auditorium (1941), and the Metcalf Refectory, and the Waterman Street dormitories (1959). In 1947, she stepped down as President and became Chair of the Board of Trustees until her retirement in 1965. Additionally she was a fine art collector and was a philanthropist.

Danforth died on October 18, 1984 in Providence. Her burial was in Swan Point Cemetery. 

Danforth was elected to the Rhode Island Women's Heritage Hall of Fame in 1998.

See also 
 List of presidents of the Rhode Island School of Design

References

External links 
 Guide to the Helen M. Danforth records, 1926-1967

1887 births
1984 deaths
People from Providence, Rhode Island
Rhode Island School of Design faculty
Burials at Swan Point Cemetery
Women heads of universities and colleges